Andy Hardy Gets Spring Fever is a 1939 American romantic comedy film directed by W. S. Van Dyke. The plot is about Andy Hardy having a crush on his high school drama teacher, Miss Rose Meredith. It is the seventh of sixteen Andy Hardy films starring Mickey Rooney.

Premise
Andy Hardy (Mickey Rooney) is upset that his girlfriend, Polly Benedict (Ann Rutherford), had fallen for Lieutenant Charles Copley (Robert Kent). Soon, Andy develops a crush on his drama teacher. After Andy's play is chosen for the school's annual production, he seizes the opportunity to spend time with his spring time crush.  Andy's dad, Judge Hardy (Lewis Stone), knows that his son is destined for heartache, but he decides to let Andy find out for himself how young love can be.

Cast
 Lewis Stone as Judge James K. 'Jim' Hardy
 Mickey Rooney as Andy Hardy
 Cecilia Parker as Marian Hardy
 Fay Holden as Mrs. Emily 'Emmy' Hardy
 Ann Rutherford as Polly Benedict
 Sara Haden as Aunt Milly Forrest
 Helen Gilbert as Miss Rose Meredith
 Terry Kilburn as Harmon 'Stickin Plaster' Higginbotham, Jr.
 John T. Murray as Don David
 George P. Breakston as 'Beezy' Anderson
 Robert Kent as Lieutenant Copley

References

External links
 
 
 
 
 

1939 films
1939 romantic comedy films
American romantic comedy films
American black-and-white films
American films based on plays
Films directed by W. S. Van Dyke
Metro-Goldwyn-Mayer films
Films scored by Edward Ward (composer)
1930s English-language films
1930s American films